Julian Kern (born December 28, 1989) is a German former road bicycle racer. Kern previously competed for the  during the 2012 season, before joining  on a two-year contract from the 2013 season onwards. In November 2014, Kern retired from cycling when his contract expired and he was unable to find a new team.

Major results

2009
6th Overall Tour des Pays de Savoie
2011
1st  Road race, UEC European Under-23 Road Championships
2012
2nd Overall Flèche du Sud
1st Stage 3
2nd Overall Tour du Loir-et-Cher
4th GP Südkärnten

References

External links 

1989 births
German male cyclists
Living people
People from Breisgau-Hochschwarzwald
Sportspeople from Freiburg (region)
Cyclists from Baden-Württemberg